Schönebürgstadion is an arena in Crailsheim, Germany.  It is primarily used for football, and is the home to the TSV Crailsheim of the Bezirksliga Hohenlohe. It opened in 1976 and holds 5,000 spectators.

External links

 StadiumDB pictures

References

Football venues in Germany
Sports venues in Baden-Württemberg